is an adult-themed adventure game released by JAST, for the Japanese NEC PC-8801 and MSX computers in May 1985.

Set in a Japanese high school, the goal of the game is to seduce Yumiko Shiraishi (白石 由美子), the star of the tennis club. To seduce her, the protagonist will have to become acquainted and intimate with her friends by talking to them.

The gameplay is simple; the player interacts with the environment by typing in commands in Japanese or choosing commands from the list using the arrow keys.

The game had moderate success, leading to standalone sequels. One of the sequels, Tenshitachi no Gogo III Bangaihen (天使たちの午後III 番外編) has a cult following in South Korea.

References

External links

Eroge
Dating sims
High school-themed video games
Japan-exclusive video games
NEC PC-8801 games
MSX games
1985 video games
Video games developed in Japan